is a railway station in the city of Obama, Fukui Prefecture, Japan, operated by West Japan Railway Company (JR West).

Lines

Station layout
The station consists of one side platform serving a single bi-directional track. The station is unattended.

Adjacent stations

History
Shin-Hirano Station opened on 10 November 1918.  With the privatization of Japanese National Railways (JNR) on 1 April 1987, the station came under the control of JR West. The station building was rebuilt in 1988.

Passenger statistics
In fiscal 2016, the station was used by an average of 77 passengers daily (boarding passengers only).

Surrounding area

Shimofunazuka Kofun
Kamifunazuka Kofun

See also
 List of railway stations in Japan

References

External links

  

Railway stations in Fukui Prefecture
Stations of West Japan Railway Company
Railway stations in Japan opened in 1918
Obama Line
Obama, Fukui